Bopolu District is one of five districts located in Gbarpolu County, Liberia.

Districts of Liberia
Gbarpolu County